Williamson County is a county in Southern Illinois. At the 2020 census, it had a population of 67,153. The largest city and county seat is Marion.

Williamson County is included in the Carbondale-Marion, IL Metropolitan Statistical Area. This area of Southern Illinois is known locally as "Little Egypt".

Via the nearby intersection of Interstates 57 and 24, and Illinois Route 13, a primary east–west four-lane expressway, the city has access to the major communities of Murphysboro, Carbondale, Carterville, Herrin, Marion and Harrisburg.

The Metro Lakeland area of Jackson-Williamson counties has a total of 120,000 residents. Carbondale (14 miles west), Herrin and Marion are the key urban areas in Metro Lakeland, with a combined population of more than 65,000. Over 235,000 people live within .

History
Williamson County was formed from Franklin County on February 28, 1839, and was named for Williamson County, Tennessee. Many of its settlers were from the Uplands South, traveling via the Ohio River from Kentucky and Virginia.

It became a center of coal mining, attracting numerous European immigrants in the late 19th and early 20th centuries. Labor tensions rose as workers sought to unionize and improve their wages and conditions. Mine owners resisted and several episodes of violence resulted during strikes and other work actions.  resulted in several episodes of violence. Williamson County is often referred to as "Bloody Williamson," due to several outbreaks of violence that have few parallels in American history.

These include the Bloody Vendetta (1876), armed confrontation between families and associates during the waning days of Reconstruction; the Carterville Massacre (1899), a Coal Strike (1906), the Herrin Massacre (1922), the Klan War (1924–1926), and the Birger/Shelton Gang War (1926). 

During the so-called Klan War, a mob of perhaps 1,300 men were deputized by the local sheriff. Starting on 1 February 1924, the posse began raiding the homes of local mine workers, mostly Italian immigrants. The Klan was inspired by both nativist and Prohibitionist fervor. Violence continued sporadically between bootleggers and the Klan. Twenty people were killed before peace was restored.

In June 1915, a Sicilian miner accused of the fatal shooting of a wealthy local resident was lynched in Johnston City, Illinois by a mob. The Illinois National Guard was deployed to prevent rioting between the miner's supporters and opponents. They were also later ordered to various locations repeatedly during the 1920s to separate warring parties and attempt to keep order.

The northwest section of the county suffered extensive damage during the Tri-State Tornado of 1925. The county was also struck by two tornadoes on May 29, 1982, which killed 10 people in the Marion, Illinois tornado outbreak. On May 8, 2009, the cities of Carterville, Herrin, and Marion were severely damaged by the May 2009 Southern Midwest derecho.

Geography

Adjacent counties
 Franklin County (north)
 Saline County (east)
 Pope County (southeast)
 Johnson County (south)
 Union County (southwest)
 Jackson County (west)

National protected area
 Crab Orchard National Wildlife Refuge (part)

Major highways

  Interstate 24
  Interstate 57
  U.S. Highway 45
  Illinois Route 13
  Illinois Route 37
  Illinois Route 148
  Illinois Route 149
  Illinois Route 166

Transit
 List of intercity bus stops in Illinois

Airport
Veterans Airport of Southern Illinois in Marion is the local airport.

Demographics

As of the 2010 United States Census, there were 66,357 people, 27,421 households, and 17,999 families residing in the county. The racial makeup of the county was 92.7% white, 3.8% black or African American, 0.8% Asian, 0.4% Native American , 0.5% from other races, and 1.7% from two or more races. Those of Hispanic or Latino origin made up 2.0% of the population. In terms of ancestry, 23.6% were German, 17.3% were Irish, 16.0% were English, 9.0% were American, and 6.1% were Italian.

Of the 27,421 households, 30.2% had children under the age of 18 living with them, 49.4% were married couples living together, 11.5% had a female householder with no husband present, 34.4% were non-families, and 29.1% of all households were made up of individuals. The average household size was 2.35 and the average family size was 2.88. The median age was 40.1 years.

The median income for a household in the county was $40,579 and the median income for a family was $50,929. Males had a median income of $41,428 versus $30,901 for females. The per capita income for the county was $22,164. About 13.3% of families and 16.7% of the population were below the poverty line, including 24.3% of those under age 18 and 9.9% of those age 65 or over.

Government and infrastructure
United States Penitentiary, Marion is located in Southern Precinct in Williamson County.

Politics
Williamson County has been solidly Republican on the national level, voting for the Republican candidates for U.S. president since 2000.

Climate and weather 

Williamson County lies on the border between humid continental climate (Köppen climate classification Dfa) and humid subtropical climate (Köppen climate classification Cfa), with neither large mountains nor large bodies of water to moderate its temperature. It is subject to both cold Arctic air and hot, humid tropical air from the Gulf of Mexico and, along with the rest of the midwestern United States, is home to some of the largest temperature extremes in the world.

The region has four distinct seasons. Spring is the wettest season and produces erratic severe weather ranging from tornadoes to winter storms. Summers are hot and humid, with only occasional and brief respite, and the humidity often makes the heat index rise to temperatures feeling well above . Fall is mild with lower humidity and can produce intermittent bouts of heavy rainfall, with the first snow flurries usually forming in late November. Winters are cold with periodic snow and temperatures often below freezing; however, thaws are usually frequent. Winter storm systems, such as Alberta clippers and Panhandle hooks, can bring days of heavy freezing rain, ice pellets, and snowfall.

The normal high temperature in July is 90 °F (32 °C), and the normal low temperature in January is 19 °F (−6 °C), although this varies from year to year. Both  and  temperatures can be seen on an average 2 or 3 days per year.

Williamson County has thunderstorms about 50 days a year on average. Thunderstorms contribute over half of the annual precipitation. Especially in the spring, these storms can often be severe, with high winds, large hail and tornadoes.

Some late autumns feature the warm weather known as Indian summer; some years see roses in bloom as late as early December.

Communities

Cities

 Carbondale (mostly in Jackson County)
 Carterville
 Creal Springs
 Herrin
 Hurst
 Johnston City
 Marion (seat) (partly in Johnson County)

Villages

 Bush
 Cambria
 Colp
 Crainville
 Energy
 Freeman Spur (partly in Franklin County)
 Pittsburg
 Spillertown
 Stonefort (mostly in Saline County)

Census-designated places
 Crab Orchard
 Whiteash

Other unincorporated communities 

 Attila
 Blairsville
 Corinth
 Crenshaw
 Dewmaine
 Dog Walk
 Dykersburg
 Fergestown
 Hudgens
 New Dennison
 No. 9
 Paineville
 Palzo
 Paulton
 Pulleys Mill
 Stiritz
 Willeford

Ghost towns
 Chamness
 Clifford
 Dewmaine
 Halfway
 Halfway (Little Juarez)

Precincts 
The following precincts are not voting precincts, but represent the 12 Congressional townships in Williamson County. Most have multiple voting precincts.

 Blairsville
 Carterville
 Corinth
 Crab Orchard
 Creal Springs
 East Marion
 Grassy
 Herrin
 Lake Creek
 Southern
 Stonefort
 West Marion

Education
School districts include:

K-12:

 Carrier Mills-Stonefort Community Unit School District
 Carterville Community Unit School District 5
 Crab Orchard Community Unit School District 3
 Frankfort Community Unit School District 168
 Galatia Community Unit School District 1
 Herrin Community Unit School District 4
 Johnston City Community Unit School District 1
 Marion Community Unit School District 2
 Zeigler-Royalton Community Unit School District 188

Secondary:
 Carbondale Community High School District 165
 Vienna High School District 133

Elementary:
 Giant City Community Consolidated School District 130
 New Simpson Hill Consolidated District 32

See also

 National Register of Historic Places listings in Williamson County
 Ku Klux Klan in Southern Illinois

References

Further reading
 Angle, Paul M. (1992). Bloody Williamson - A Chapter in American Lawlessness. University of Illinois Press. .
 Ayabe, Masatomo, “Ku Kluxers in a Coal Mining Community: A Study of the Ku Klux Klan Movement in Williamson County, Illinois, 1923–1926,” Journal of the Illinois State Historical Society, 102 (Spring 2009), 73–100.
 Erwin, Milo. 1876, Rep. 1976. History of Williamson County, Illinois. Marion, Ill.: Williamson County Historical Society.
 Erwin, Milo, and Jon Musgrave. 2006. The Bloody Vendetta of Southern Illinois. Marion, Ill.: IllinoisHistory.com. 240 pages.
 Johnson, Ralph, and Jon Musgrave. 2010. Secrets of the Herrin Gangs. Marion, Ill.: IllinoisHistory.com. 96 pages.

 
Illinois counties
1839 establishments in Illinois
Populated places established in 1839
Williamson County, Illinois
Williamson County, Illinois